Syed Ali Jafar is an Indian-American electrical engineer and computer scientist. He works at the University of California, Irvine, and has previously worked at Lucent Bell Labs, Qualcomm and Hughes Software Systems. His research interests include multi-user information theory, wireless communications and network coding. He was named Fellow of the Institute of Electrical and Electronics Engineers (IEEE) in 2014 "for contributions to analyzing the capacity of wireless communication networks" and won the Blavatnik Award for Young Scientists in 2015 "for his discoveries in interference alignment in wireless networks, changing the field’s thinking about how these networks should be designed."

Career 
He studied electrical engineering at the Indian Institute of Technology (IIT) in Delhi, where he earned a B.Tech in 1997. He then studied electrical engineering in the United States, receiving an MSc at the California Institute of Technology in 1999 and then a PhD at Stanford University in 2003. He then worked at University of California, Irvine, while occasionally also holding positions at Lucent Bell Labs, Qualcomm and Hughes Software Systems. He studied communications networks and solved problems in network information theory, and made numerous discoveries in the area of wireless communication and networks, including important discoveries in interference alignment in wireless networks.

Interference alignment 
An important discovery in wireless network design is interference alignment. A specialized application was previously studied by Yitzhak Birk and Tomer Kol for an index coding problem in 1998. In the context of interference management for wireless communication, interference alignment was first introduced by Mohammad Ali Maddah-Ali, Abolfazl S. Motahari, and Amir Keyvan Khandani, from the University of Waterloo, for wireless X channel. Interference alignment was eventually established as a general principle by Jafar and Viveck R. Cadambe in 2008, when they introduced "a mechanism to align an arbitrarily large number of interferers, leading to the surprising conclusion that wireless networks are not essentially interference limited." This led to the adoption of interference alignment in the design of wireless networks.

Jafar explained:

According to New York University senior researcher Paul Horn:

References 

American electrical engineers
American information theorists
Fellow Members of the IEEE
Indian computer scientists
Indian electrical engineers
Indian emigrants to the United States
Living people
Year of birth missing (living people)